Yuki Mizutani (born 11 April 1996) is a Japanese professional footballer who plays as a midfielder for WE League club Urawa Reds.

Club career 
Mizutani made her WE League debut on 12 September 2021.

References 

Living people
1996 births
Japanese women's footballers
Women's association football midfielders
Association football people from Kanagawa Prefecture
People from Kamakura
Urawa Red Diamonds Ladies players
WE League players